Ust-Kara is a village on the eastern border of Zapolyarny District, Nenets Autonomous Okrug, Russia. It had a population of 574 as of 2010, a decrease from its population of 677 in 2002.

Geography 

The village is located at the mouth of the Kara, next to the border with Yamalo-Nenets Autonomous Okrug. The nearest major city is Vorkuta, which is about 200 km south. Southwest of the settlement is the Kara crater, which is one of the largest craters on Earth, at 65 km in diameter.

History

In 2003, there was a hepatitis A outbreak in the village. One year later, in 2004, the only school in the village burned down, followed by the decision to build a new one.

Transport

There is no road to Ust-Kara, so the village can only be reached by a flight from Naryan-Mar.

Climate

Ust-Kara has a subarctic climate (Dfc).

Notable people

Andrey Rasbash (December 15, 1952 — July 23, 2006) - figure TV, cameraman and film director, television presenter, and producer.

References 

Rural localities in Nenets Autonomous Okrug